Plagiomene is an extinct genus of early flying lemur-like mammal from North America that lived during the Eoecene epoch.

References

Prehistoric mammals of North America
Paleocene mammals
Eocene mammals
Prehistoric placental genera